Peter Müller (born 11 October 1948) is a retired West German football midfielder.

References

1948 births
Living people
West German footballers
1. FC Bocholt players
2. Bundesliga players
Association football midfielders